Bigg Boss is the Malayalam-language version of Indian reality television series Bigg Boss, produced by Endemol Shine India and broadcast on Asianet. The show was launched on 24 June 2018, which marked the beginning of the first season, which ended on 30 September 2018, lasting 99 episodes. It was renewed for a second season which premiered on 5 January 2020. Mohanlal is the host of the show.

The show follows selected number of contestants, known as housemates, who are isolated from the outside world for 100 days (or 15 weeks) in a custom built house. The housemates are continuously monitored during their stay in the house by live television cameras as well as personal audio microphones. They are dictated by an omnipresent entity named Bigg Boss. Each week, one or more of the housemates are evicted by a public vote.

Series overview

Episodes

Season 1 (2018) 

The first season premiered on 24 June 2018 and ended on 30 September 2018. The house was built at Mumbai where 18 housemates contested (two of them being wildcard entries). Mohanlal was the host of the season. Sabumon Abdusamad emerged as the winner after 98 days.

Season 2 (2020) 

The second season premiered on 5 January 2019. Mohanlal returned as the host. The house was built at Chennai, where 17 contestants entered on day-1.

BB Cafe
BB Cafe is an aftershow hosted by Rajesh Keshav and Gopika that discusses episodes aired on the previous day. Each episode is approximately five minutes long. BB Cafe Live, a 30-minute live show is also aired daily on Asianet's YouTube channel that discuss the live comments on YouTube.

Season 3 (2021)

References

External links
 

Lists of reality television series episodes